Charles Hosmer Morse (September 23, 1833 – May 5, 1921) was an American businessman and philanthropist. Morse was born at St. Johnsbury, Vermont. He graduated from St. Johnsbury Academy in 1850. Shortly after graduation he joined his uncle, Zelotus Hosmer, in the Boston office of E. & T. Fairbanks, marketing platform scales. He was promoted to the New York office, and then to Chicago, eventually establishing a branch that would go on to be known as Fairbanks-Morse corporation. He was also an early resident of and influential figure in the city of Winter Park, Florida.

Morse was a prominent developer in Chicago, for whom Morse Avenue in far-north Rogers Park takes its name.

See also
Charles Hosmer Morse Museum of American Art

Footnotes

External links
 History of Charles Hosmer Morse and Elizabeth Morse Genius Charitable Trust
 Biography of Charles Hosmer Morse at the Morse Museum of American Art, Winter Park, Florida website
 Short biography of Charles Hosmer Morse at Winter Park Public Library

1833 births
1921 deaths
People from Caledonia County, Vermont